Pyeongchang or PyeongChang may refer to:

Sports
 2018 Winter Olympics, the PyeongChang Games
 2018 Winter Paralympics, the PyeongChang Games
 Pyeongchang Olympic Stadium, Daegwallyeong Township, Pyeongchang County, Gangwon Province, South Korea
 Pyeongchang FC, Pyeongchang-gun, Gangwon-do, South Korea; a soccer team

Places
 Pyeongchang-gun (Pyeongchang County), Gangwon Province, South Korea (Hanja: 平昌郡; P'yŏngch'ang-gun) a county with ski resorts
 Pyeongchang-eup (Pyeongchang Town), Pyeongchang-gun, Gangwon-do, South Korea (Hanja: 平昌邑; P'yŏngch'ang-ŭp) the seat of the eponymous county
 Pyeongchang-dong (Pyeongchang Neighbourhood), Jongno-gu (Jongno District), Seoul, South Korea (Hanja: 平倉洞; P'yongch'ang-tong) a neighbourhood favoured by celebrities
 Gangneung-shi (Gangneung City), Gangwon, South Korea; a city that hosts many events for the 2018 PyeongChang Games, hence also known through association as of PyeongChang city.
 Alpensia Resort, Daegwallyeong Township, Pyeongchang County, Gangwon Province, South Korea; host of alpine events of the 2018 PyeongChang Games, hence also known through association as the PyeongChang Ski Resort
 Daegwallyeong-myeon (Daegwallyeong Township), Pyeongchang-gun, Gangwon-do, South Korea; a township that hosts many of the outdoor events of the 2018 PyeongChang Games, hence also known through association as the PyeongChang township.

See also
 Pyeong
 Chang (disambiguation)
 
 
 
 
 
 Pyongyang
 Pyonggang
 Pingchang (disambiguation)